Thomas Cochran may refer to:
 Thomas Cochran (Nova Scotia politician) (1733–1801), merchant and politician in Nova Scotia
 Thomas Cochran (judge) (1777–1804), third Chief Justice of Prince Edward Island and judge in Upper Canada
 Thomas Cochran (banker) (1871–1936), vice-president, Astor Trust Company, 1906–1914; president, Liberty National Bank of New York, 1914–1916
 Thomas Cunningham Cochran (1877–1957), U.S. Representative from Pennsylvania, 1927–1935
 Thomas C. Cochran (historian) (1902–1999), U.S. historian of business

Tom Cochran may refer to:
 Tom Cochran (American football) (1924–2010), NFL football player for Washington Redskins
 Tom Cochran (politician) (born 1953), member of Michigan House of Representatives
 Tom Cochran (technologist) (born 1977), Obama administration technology official

See also
 Thomas Cochrane (disambiguation)